Suraini Abd-Aziz is a Malaysian biochemist. She won a 2001 L'Oréal-UNESCO For Women in Science Awards.

She teaches at University of Putra. She helped to develop a palm oil waste to ethanol process.

Works 

 Abdul Rahman, N., Abdul Rahman, N., Abd Aziz, S., & Hassan, M. (2013). Production of Ligninolytic Enzymes by Newly Isolated Bacteria from Palm Oil Plantation Soils. BioResources, 8(4), 6136-6150.

References 

Living people
Year of birth missing (living people)
Malaysian chemists
Malaysian women scientists
L'Oréal-UNESCO Awards for Women in Science laureates